Winx Club: The Secret of the Lost Kingdom (Italian: Winx Club - Il segreto del regno perduto) is a 2007 Italian computer-animated film based on the television series Winx Club, taking place after the events of the first three seasons. The film premiered on November 30, 2007, in Italy.

The film was animated by Rainbow S.p.A. In February 2011, Nickelodeon's parent company Viacom became a co-owner of Rainbow, and it was announced that Viacom would re-release The Secret of the Lost Kingdom through its subsidiary Paramount Pictures. Nickelodeon U.S. premiered the movie on March 11, 2012, and Paramount released it on DVD on August 7, 2012.

Plot
Bloom and her friends, Flora, Stella, Musa, Aisha and Tecna, are on a search for Bloom's missing birth parents, King Oritel and Queen Marion, who Bloom believes are still alive. The girls track down Hagen, a blacksmith who forged the powerful sword of Oritel, a magical sword that can never be separated from its rightful master, in hopes that he can trace the sword's power to Bloom's parents. The girls successfully sneak into Hagen's castle but when they encounter Hagen, he believes they are intruders. Soon, Faragonda, an old friend of Hagen's, arrives and they return to Alfea to discuss the matter. Bloom begs Hagen for help, but he admits that he is unable to aid her. Bloom feels guilty for the effort her friends have put in when it had been hopeless the whole time, and runs off in tears to avoid facing them.

Most of the third-year fairies at Alfea, including the Winx (sans Bloom), graduate and become guardian fairies of their home planets, after having earned their Enchantix powers. Due to Bloom's powers being incomplete, she is compelled to stay behind as she watches her friends graduate. Sky comes to comfort her, encouraging her to continue her quest despite Hagen's words. They share a tender moment until a mysterious girl arrives, forcing Sky to leave in a hurry, although he promises Bloom that he will explain everything later.

The next day, Bloom leaves for Earth to stay with her adoptive parents. Although she seems happy, Mike and Vanessa see that Bloom is uncomfortable living on Earth, and that she belongs more in the Magical Dimension. The same night, Bloom has a dream about Daphne, who tells her that there is still hope; their parents are still alive. She offers Bloom her strength through her mask, and also informs her about the Book of Fate - a tome their father kept that tells the entire history of Domino, and its location.

The next morning, Bloom is surprised to see all of her friends at her house to celebrate her birthday. Bloom shares her plan and they all agree to help her, reminding her of their everlasting friendship. The restoration of Bloom's hope triggers the sword of Oritel, deep within the dark Obsidian Circle, the center of all evil forces. Its glow troubles the spiritual forms of the three Ancestral Witches, who caused the destruction of Domino. They employ Obsidian's keeper, Mandragora, to root out the cause of the sword's reactivation and snuff it out, additionally imbuing Mandragora with a fraction of their dark powers.

Meanwhile, the team heads to Domino. Borrowing Daphne's mask, Bloom recalls her sister's memories of when Domino was a paradise before it was covered with ice and snow. The group reach the mountain where the book is hidden, but Tecna informs them of a mystical bird called the Roc that guards the library. The Specialists scale the mountain first, but accidentally causes the Roc to awaken, who flies off with the boys. The girls save them with Musa's harmonic spells and successfully allow the Roc to land.

Inside the library, Bloom and the others meet Bartelby, Oritel's deceased scribe in spiritual form, who shows them the Book of Fate. In it, they discover that Bloom's parents were part of a good warrior group known as the Company of Light, that served to eradicate evil in the form of the three Ancestral Witches and that Oritel as well as all the people of Domino are currently trapped in the Obsidian Circle. However, the team finds the remaining pages empty after chronicling the Company of Light's battle with the Ancestral Witches, with no clue on the outcome. Bartelby then foretells a prophecy where six legendary warriors will save Domino, and that a king without a crown will free the Sword of King Oritel. As the team celebrates this new discovery, Riven is bitten by one of Mandragora's spy bugs and becomes her puppet.

Soon after, Alfea is attacked by Mandragora, who, despite being defeated, learns more about Bloom and disappears, dutifully reporting about the second princess of Domino. Following Mandragora's defeat, the group restore a destroyed Alfea, and then begin searching for a way into the Obsidian Circle, which leads them to Pixie Village. With the help of Lockette, they head to the gateway to the Obsidian Circle. As the girls enter, Mandragora appears and forces Riven to battle Sky and retrieve the key, separating the girls and the boys. Just as he is about to stab Sky, Musa jumps in front of him and is injured.

The girls are forced to face their worst fears, and Bloom sees a vision of what happened to her birth parents: Oritel was pulled into the Obsidian Circle by the Ancestral Witches while Marion absorbed herself into the sword in order to be with him. To Bloom's horror, she sees her father frozen in stone, the same fate for all inhabitants of her planet. All the fairies then wake up from their trances, only to come face-to-face with the Ancestral Witches, who severely weaken the Winx except Bloom. They force Bloom to make a choice between destroying the sword and saving her adoptive parents or taking the sword and letting Mandragora kill them, as seen in an image. Luckily, Bloom sees through the illusion and places her trust in the boys, while they are still fighting Mandragora, unleashing the power of the Dragon Flame.

Outside, Riven recalls all what he and Musa have been through together. Regaining his sanity, he lifts her up and they kiss. Meanwhile, chasing after Mandragora, Sky arrives moments later to aid a struggling Bloom and takes the sword, but supposedly dies, as only a king can wield the sword.

Eventually Bloom's Dragon Flame also succumbs under the darkness of the Obsidian Circle and is ready to give up when Daphne reminds her that she is not alone. She puts on the mask, and Daphne joins with her to destroy the Ancestral Witches. However, Mandragora returns and the Ancestral Witches use her body as a host and begin to strangle Bloom to death, but Sky reawakens and stabs Mandragora with Oritel's sword, allowing Bloom to use the power of the Dragon Flame on Mandragora, destroying both her and the entire Obsidian Circle, and freeing everyone. Sky explains that he is now the king of Eraklyon, and his coronation was the night he left Bloom at Alfea. With Domino restored to its former glory, Oritel is freed from stone, placing Marion back in human form; Bloom's Enchantix power is complete, and she is finally reunited with her birth parents.

At a party afterwards, Oritel and Marion promise Bloom that they will never leave her again. Mike and Vanessa are also there and are greeted by a hug from Bloom. Oritel begins the traditional father-daughter dance, but lets Bloom dance with Sky, who proposes to her. She delightfully accepts, and as they kiss, Bartelby appears by the Book of Fate, telling the audience that the prophecy has been fulfilled; Bloom is now a guardian fairy and there is a new Company of Light - the Winx.

In the final scene, it is revealed the Ancestral Witches have not been destroyed. Instead, they were freed with the destruction of the Obsidian Circle and are finding new hosts to take over and destroy the Winx. They are shown with their direct descendants, the Trix, cackling madly. This is a cliffhanger leading to the second film.

Voice cast
The actors in the English versions are uncredited.

Soundtrack

Elisa Rosselli sings the first six songs on the soundtrack. Natalie Imbruglia sings the film's ending song, "All the Magic".

Distribution

A live-action dance show was performed to promote the film at the 2007 Rome Film Festival. In the first week of showing, the film was distributed in 665 cinemas and had 420,000 viewers. It received 1,979,972 euros ($3,074,695.84 US) in its opening week, and ended its run with five million euros in revenue. It was released on DVD in Italy in March 2008.

The movie premiered on Nickelodeon in America on March 11, 2012. All of the dialogue was re-recorded with the voice actors from the 2011 Winx Club revival. This version was released as a two-disc DVD set on August 7, 2012, by Paramount Pictures. The second disc included seven bonus episodes from the TV series. In October 2013, Nickelodeon released a line of DVDs called "Holiday Gifts from Nickelodeon," including a special Christmas edition of The Secret of the Lost Kingdom that came with a Winx Club coloring book, poster, and stickers.

Sequel
On October 29, 2010, a sequel, Winx Club 3D: Magical Adventure, was released in Italy.

References

External links

 
 

2007 films
2007 computer-animated films
Animated films based on animated series
Italian animated fantasy films
Italian animated films
Italian fantasy adventure films
Winx Club films
Nickelodeon animated films
Paramount Pictures films
Paramount Pictures animated films
Italian films about revenge
Animated films about revenge
Rainbow S.r.l. films
Films directed by Iginio Straffi
Films produced by Iginio Straffi
Films with screenplays by Iginio Straffi
2000s American films